Chapter VII: Hope & Sorrow is the seventh studio album by American rock band Sevendust, and the last to feature guitarist Sonny Mayo who was replaced by original guitarist Clint Lowery before the release of the album. It was released on April 1, 2008, through the band's own 7 Bros. Records, in conjunction with Warner Music Group's Independent Label Group. The album features guest appearances by Chris Daughtry (Daughtry), Myles Kennedy (Alter Bridge, Slash), and Mark Tremonti (Alter Bridge, Tremonti, Creed).

Track listing

Personnel 
 Lajon Witherspoon – lead vocals
 John Connolly – lead guitar, backing vocals
 Sonny Mayo – rhythm guitar
 Vinnie Hornsby – bass
 Morgan Rose – drums, backing vocals
 Travis Daniels - programming, cello (1), keyboards (1, 3)
 Mark Tremonti - lead guitar (3)
 Chris Daughtry - additional vocals (6)
 Myles Kennedy - additional vocals (9)

Chart positions

Album

Singles

References 

Sevendust albums
2008 albums
Warner Music Group albums